The common short-legged skink (Brachymeles elerae) is a species of skink endemic to the Philippines. It is found throughout most of the country, albeit very rarely, and hence the species is poorly characterized.

References

Reptiles of the Philippines
Reptiles described in 1917
Brachymeles
Taxa named by Edward Harrison Taylor